Deaf West Theatre is a non-profit arts organization based in Los Angeles, California, USA. It is most well known for its Tony Award-nominated productions of Big River and Spring Awakening.

Deaf West Theatre is led by Artistic Director, DJ Kurs.

History 
Established in 1991 by Founding Artistic Director, Ed Waterstreet, Deaf West Theatre engages artists and audiences in unparalleled theater experiences inspired by Deaf culture and the expressive power of sign language. Committed to innovation, collaboration, and training, Deaf West Theatre is the artistic bridge between the deaf and hearing worlds. Deaf West productions are traditionally performed in American Sign Language with voice translation occurring at the same time so it is accessible to both deaf and hearing audiences. Deaf West has also held workshops for deaf youth who come from underprivileged communities and supported young deaf individuals who have a career in the arts. It is currently led by Artistic Director David Kurs.

Productions 
Notable past productions include Our Town by Thornton Wilder in a co-production with Pasadena Playhouse; Edward Albee's At Home at the Zoo in a co-production with The Wallis Annenberg Center for the Performing Arts; Spring Awakening, which transferred from Inner-City Arts to The Wallis Annenberg and then to Broadway where it received three Tony Award nominations, including Best Revival; American Buffalo, which was labeled a Los Angeles Times Critic's Choice; Cyrano, a co-production with the Fountain Theatre which received the Los Angeles Drama Critics Circle Award for Outstanding Production; Big River which received two Tony Award nominations (including Best Revival), Pippin, produced at the Mark Taper Forum in a co-production with Center Theatre Group; Oliver! which received the Ovation Award for Best Musical, and A Streetcar Named Desire which received the Ovation Award for Best Play.

Awards & Nominations

References

External links

Theatres in California
Deaf culture in the United States
Deafness arts organizations
Performing groups established in 1989
Theatre companies in California
1989 establishments in California
Disability organizations based in the United States
Disability theatre